Edna Bay is a city on Kosciusko Island in the Prince of Wales-Hyder Census Area in the U.S. state of Alaska. The community was officially incorporated on October 13, 2014 and has a population of 42 as of the 2010 Census, down from 49 in 2000.

Edna Bay is the only populated town on Kosciusko Island, and has both year-round and seasonal residents.  Year-round residents are either retired or work primarily in the fishing and logging industries.  Some permanent residents also work seasonally off-island in various industries.  Due to the very remote location of Edna Bay and the subsequent difficulty and expense of traveling between Edna Bay and larger Southeast Alaska communities, subsistence hunting, fishing, and gathering comprise a large portion of the livelihood activities for residents of Edna Bay.

Geography
Edna Bay is located at  (55.978539, -133.676356).

Demographics

Edna Bay first appeared on the 1950 U.S. Census as an unincorporated village. It appeared again in 1960 and 1970, but did not appear on the 1980 census. In 1990, it was made a census-designated place (CDP). It formally incorporated in 2014.

As of the census of 2000, there were 49 people, 19 households, and 14 families residing in the city. The population density was 0.9 people per square mile (0.3/km2). There were 40 housing units at an average density of 0.7/sq mi (0.3/km2). The racial makeup of the city was 95.92% White, and 4.08% from two or more races.

There were 19 households, out of which 36.8% had children under the age of 18 living with them, 63.2% were married couples living together, and 26.3% were non-families. 26.3% of all households were made up of individuals, and 10.5% had someone living alone who was 65 years of age or older. The average household size was 2.58 and the average family size was 3.14.

In the city the population was spread out, with 28.6% under the age of 18, 6.1% from 18 to 24, 18.4% from 25 to 44, 40.8% from 45 to 64, and 6.1% who were 65 years of age or older. The median age was 37 years. For every 100 females, there were 157.9 males. For every 100 females age 18 and over, there were 133.3 males.

The median income for a household in the city was $44,583, and the median income for a family was $49,063. Males had a median income of $40,625 versus $0 for females. The per capita income for the city was $58,967. There were 15.4% of families and 23.1% of the population living below the poverty line, including 29.4% of under eighteens and 50.0% of those over 64.

Economy
, Edna Bay hosts a combined general store and post office, a non-denominational Christian church, several sawmills and two licensed building contractors.  There is a small state-owned marina and float-plane dock which are unattended (self-service).  At present there are cabin rentals and two lodges on Kosciusko Island.  Visitors to Edna Bay without a local contact would be well advised to bring with them everything needed for remote outdoor survival, although food and a limited selection of non-food supplies can be purchased at the general store located approximately 3 miles by road from the marina.  The general store and post office is open from 2PM to 4PM Tuesdays through Saturdays.  Most land in and around Edna Bay is privately held and there are no public camping or day-use facilities.  Unescorted visitors should first check with the local residents before attempting to trespass, camp, or hunt in the area.

Residents of Edna Bay have available to them both land-line telephone and broadband internet.  Cellular phone service in Edna Bay is rare and intermittent.  There are two outdoor public phones (one at the marina inside the access ramp and another located on the opposite side of the bay from the marina).  Starting in 2008, Edna Bay will also be home to an engineering and software development company, made possible due to the broadband-internet service brought to the community by the State of Alaska and AP&T.

References

External links

 

Cities in Alaska
Cities in Prince of Wales–Hyder Census Area, Alaska
Cities in Unorganized Borough, Alaska
Former census-designated places in Alaska
Populated places established in 2014
Populated coastal places in Alaska on the Pacific Ocean